

Events 
September 16 – Philip "Little Farfel" Kavolick, a member of Meyer Lansky's syndicate organization, is murdered in Valley Stream, New York.
November 25 – Robert "Tinman" Sneddon, notorious Irish gangster, evades police in Boston, Massachusetts after a warrant is issued for his arrest.

Arts and literature
Raoul Walsh's White Heat is released starring James Cagney, Edmond O'Brien and Virginia Mayo.

Births
Louis Eppolito, NYPD officer and mob hitman
Frank P. Frassetto, Rochester mobster
Mahmood Ozdemir, UK Turkish crime boss
Leonidas Vargas, Colombian drug lord
24 October – Francisco Rafael Arellano Félix, Mexican drug lord and Tijuana Cartel member.

Deaths
September 16 – Philip Kavolick "Little Farfel", Meyer Lansky associate and National Crime Syndicate member

Organized crime
Years in organized crime